Baining may refer to:
Baining people
Baining languages
Baining Mountains
Inland Baining Rural LLG
Lassul Baining Rural LLG